Cleopatra Brown (December 8, 1907 or 1909 – April 15, 1995), known as Cleo Brown, C. Patra Brown or Cleo Patra Brown,  was an American blues and jazz vocalist and pianist. She was the first woman instrumentalist to receive the NEA Jazz Masters Fellowship.

Life
While Brown's place of birth has been published as Meridian, Mississippi, Brown told W. Balliett in a 1986 interview published in The New Yorker that she was born in De Kalb, Mississippi shortly before her father took a position as a pastor in Meridian. She played piano in the Baptist church as a child. In 1919 her family moved to Chicago, and she began learning piano from her brother who worked with "Pine Top" Smith, playing boogie-woogie for dances. From around 1923 she worked in vaudeville, as well as taking gigs in clubs. In 1935, she replaced Fats Waller as pianist on New York radio station WABC.

From the 1930s to the 1950s she toured the United States regularly, recording for Decca Records (among other labels) along the way and recording many humorous, ironic titles such as "Breakin' in a New Pair of Shoes", "Mama Don't Want No Peas and Rice and Coconut Oil", "When Hollywood Goes Black and Tan", and "The Stuff Is Here and It's Mellow". Her stride piano playing was often compared to Fats Waller, and she is credited as an influence on Dave Brubeck, who played during the intermissions of her shows, and Marian McPartland. She played regularly at clubs in Chicago, toured widely, and recorded for both Decca and Capitol Records.

Brown began to shy away from singing bawdy blues songs because of her deepening religious beliefs and, in 1953, she was baptized, retired from music, and became a nurse in 1959. Jazz biographies frequently listed her as deceased due to her absence from music. The song "Sweet Cleo Brown" was recorded by Brubeck in tribute to her.

From the mid-1970s until 1981, she performed under the name of C. Patra Brown on radio shows in Denver, Colorado. She replaced boogie-woogie music with slower, inspirational music. She returned to record again, and performed on National Public Radio.

She gave birth to a son, Matthew, and had four grandchildren. She died on April 15, 1995 in Denver, Colorado.

Discography
 Living in the Afterglow (Audiophile, 1989)
 1935–1951 (Chronological Classics)

References

1900s births
1995 deaths
American women jazz singers
American jazz singers
American blues singers
Singers from Mississippi
Singers from Chicago
Musicians from Meridian, Mississippi
Savoy Records artists
American jazz pianists
20th-century American women pianists
20th-century American pianists
20th-century American women singers
Jazz musicians from Illinois
Jazz musicians from Mississippi
20th-century American singers
Decca Records artists